Namut and Nginamanu are dialects of a language of central Flores, in East Nusa Tenggara Province, Indonesia. They are closely related to Ngadha.

References 

Sumba languages
Languages of Indonesia